The Antigua and Barbuda Fed Cup team represents Antigua and Barbuda in Fed Cup tennis competition and are governed by the Antigua and Barbuda Tennis Association.  They have not competed since 2001.

History
Antigua and Barbuda competed in its first Fed Cup in 1997.  They have won only one tie to date (vs. Barbados in 2001).

See also
Fed Cup
Antigua and Barbuda Davis Cup team

External links

Billie Jean King Cup teams
Fed Cup
Fed Cup